This is a list of very-high-bit-rate digital subscriber line (VDSL) and very-high-bit-rate digital subscriber line 2 (VDSL2) deployments.

The term VDSL can either refer specifically to ITU-T G.993.1 (first generation VDSL, officially abbreviated as "VDSL", unofficially also called "VDSL1"), or may be used as an umbrella term for both ITU-T G.993.1 and ITU-T G.993.2 (second generation VDSL, officially abbreviated "VDSL2").

Africa

Asia

Central America and the Caribbean

Europe

North America

Oceania

South America

References

Digital subscriber line